Anna Bates is a former Zimbabwean international lawn bowler.

Bowls career
Bates won a historic gold medal for Zimbabwe at the Commonwealth Games because it was the first time that Zimbabwe as a nation competed in the Games.

She played in the team that won the gold medal in the triples event with Flo Kennedy and Margaret Mills at the 1982 Commonwealth Games.

References

Zimbabwean female bowls players
Living people
Bowls players at the 1982 Commonwealth Games
Commonwealth Games medallists in lawn bowls
Commonwealth Games gold medallists for Zimbabwe
Year of birth missing (living people)
Medallists at the 1982 Commonwealth Games